The Democratic Janata Dal is a political party in Jammu and Kashmir. DJD had merged with the Jammu & Kashmir National Conference in 1998, but on 3 February 1999 DJD was revived as a separate party.  The party president is Ghulam Qadir Wani and the general secretary is Yograj Singh.

References

External links
 

Political parties in Jammu and Kashmir
1999 establishments in Jammu and Kashmir
Political parties established in 1999
Political parties with year of establishment missing